The Bowdoin Prizes are prestigious awards given annually to Harvard University undergraduate and graduate students.  From the income of the bequest of Governor James Bowdoin, AB 1745, prizes are offered to students at the University in graduate and undergraduate categories for work in the English Language, in the Natural Sciences, in Greek, and in Latin. Each winner of a Bowdoin Prize receives, in addition to a sum of money, a medal, a certificate, and his or her name printed in the Commencement Program.

The award was established in 1791, and past winners include (with year of award and professional highlights):
Jared Sparks, 1815, historian and president of Harvard
Ralph Waldo Emerson, 1820 and 1821, essayist and poet
Charles Sumner, 1830 and 1832, politician and US Senator
Jones Very, 1835 and 1836, Transcendentalist essayist and poet
Richard Henry Dana, Jr., 1837, lawyer and politician
Edward Everett Hale, 1838 and 1839, author and historian
Charles L. Flint, 1849, lawyer, horticulturalist, president of what is now University of Massachusetts Amherst
Horatio Alger, Jr., 1851, prolific author of "rags to riches" novels
Henry Adams, 1858, historian and author
Richard Theodore Greener, 1870, statesman and dean of Howard University School of Law
George Lyman Kittredge, 1881 and 1882, educator and scholar in English literature
Alain LeRoy Locke, 1907, first African-American Rhodes Scholar, academic, writer, and "Father of the Harlem Renaissance"
R. Nathaniel Dett, 1920, composer
George Frazier, 1933, journalist
Nathan Pusey, 1934, president of Harvard
Daniel J. Boorstin, 1934, Rhodes Scholar, historian, and winner of the Pulitzer Prize
Howard Nemerov, 1940, poet and winner of the Pulitzer Prize and National Book Award
I. Bernard Cohen, 1941, historian of science
Robert Galambos, 1941, neuroscientist
Arthur Kinoy, 1941, attorney and civil rights leader
Constantine Cavarnos, 1947, teacher, author, monk
Henri Dorra, 1949, art historian 
Christopher Lasch, 1954, professor, author, historian, and social critic
John Updike, 1954, writer
Allen G. Debus, 1957 and 1958, historian of science
Larry Siedentop, 1959, Marshall Scholar, political philosopher
Edward Said, 1960, Palestinian essayist and academic 
James Samuel Gordon, 1961 and 1962, author, psychiatrist, and mind-body medicine expert
Patrick T. Riley, 1966 and 1967, political science professor
Robert Kirshner, 1970, astrophysicist
Paul Starr, 1974, professor of sociology and public affairs
Ralph Jay Hexter, 1974, professor of classics and comparative literature and provost of UC Davis
James D. Weinrich, 1975, sex researcher and psychobiologist
Robert W. Brooks, 1975, mathematician
John Glover Roberts, Jr., 1976, Chief Justice of the United States
Paul Alan Cox, 1978 and 1981, ethnobotanist
Richard H. Ebright, 1979, molecular and microbiologist
Mark W. Moffett, 1986, entomologist
Jonathan Veitch, 1988, historian and president of Occidental College
Nicholas A. Christakis, 1988, physician and sociologist
Cyrus Patell, 1991, literary and cultural critic
Faith Salie, 1992, Rhodes Scholar, actress, and media personality
David S. Jones, 1993, historian and professor of the culture of medicine
Elaine Goldenberg, 1993, lawyer
William Pannapacker, 1995 and 1999, academic and journalist
Mark Greif, 1997, Marshall Scholar, academic and literary critic
Joe Roman, 2000, author and conservation biologist
Manda Clair Jost, 2001 and 2002 (consecutive years), evolutionary biologist
Vivek Ramaswamy, 2007, entrepreneur in the healthcare and technology sectors, political commentator, and a New York Times bestselling author

See also
Harvard University

References

Awards by university and college in the United States
Harvard University